The Nsukka group is the name given to a group of Nigerian artists associated with the University of Nigeria, Nsukka.

Description 

The Nsukka group was known for working to revive the practice of uli and incorporate its designs into contemporary art using media such as acrylic paint, tempera, gouache, pen and ink, pastel, oil paint, and watercolor.  Although traditionally uli artists were female, many of the artists of the group were male. Some were poets and writers in addition to being artists.

The Nsukka group evolved as a trend that can be sensed in the works of some African artists. It usually reveals itself an original mix of cubism and primitive arts.

In October 1997, the National Museum of African Art of the Smithsonian Institution launched the exhibition The Poetics of the Line: Seven Artists of the Nsukka Group, which also was the inaugural exhibition of the Sylvia H. Williams Gallery.

Members 

 Tayo Adenaike
 El Anatsui
 Chike Aniakor
 Olu Oguibe
 Uche Okeke
 Ada Udechukwu
 Obiora Udechukwu

References

Bibliography

External links 

 Description of the group from the National Museum of African Art

Nigerian artists
African artist groups and collectives
University of Nigeria